Presidential elections were held in Kiribati on 3 July 1991. The result was a victory for Teatao Teannaki, who received 46% of the vote. Voter turnout was 74%.

Results

References

Kiribati
President
Presidential elections in Kiribati
Non-partisan elections
Election and referendum articles with incomplete results